Sigmops bathyphilus, commonly called the spark anglemouth, deepsea fangjaw or deepsea lightfish, is a species of fish in the family Gonostomatidae (anglemouths).

Description

It has 11–15 dorsal soft rays and 22–26 anal soft rays. It has very small photophores. It has a few enlarged teeth on the roof of the mouth.

Habitat
Sigmops bathyphilus lives in the Atlantic Ocean, southern Indian Ocean, off the south coast of Australia and South Pacific Ocean.

Behaviour
Some individuals are "super males", who do not change sex and are the principal spawners.

References

Gonostomatidae
Fish described in 1884
Taxa named by Léon Vaillant